Toropetsky Uyezd (Торо́пецкий уе́зд) was one of the subdivisions of the Pskov Governorate of the Russian Empire. It was situated in the southeastern part of the governorate. Its administrative centre was Toropets.

Demographics
At the time of the Russian Empire Census of 1897, Toropetsky Uyezd had a population of 96,472. Of these, 92.7% spoke Russian, 3.0% Estonian, 1.7% Yiddish, 1.4% Latvian, 0.8% Finnish, 0.2% German and 0.2% Polish as their native language.

References

 
Uezds of Pskov Governorate
Pskov Governorate